Robert Clohessy (born June 10, 1957) is an American actor. He is best known for playing Correctional Officer Sean Murphy on the HBO prison drama Oz from seasons 3–6, in addition to playing Officer Patrick Flaherty on the NBC police procedural Hill Street Blues, Warden Boss James Neary on the HBO crime drama Boardwalk Empire for the first two seasons and Lieutenant Sid Gormley on the CBS police drama Blue Bloods.

Early life
Clohessy was born in the Bronx, New York, the son of John Clohessy, a police officer. He fought in the 1975 Golden Gloves in Madison Square Garden. He graduated from Pearl River High School in Pearl River, New York, and from SUNY Purchase where he studied under Walt Witcover.

Career
Clohessy has had recurring roles in daytime dramas All My Children, Boy Meets World, and Guiding Light. In primetime, he has become known for his multiple regular turns as police officers and other law enforcement officials, creating parallels between his acting career and upbringing by his policeman father. The first of such roles was in the seventh and final season of Hill Street Blues, as Officer Patrick Flaherty. The following season, Clohessy was cast as the new co-star of Pat Morita on the ABC detective series Ohara, playing Lt. George Shaver. In 1995, he appeared in the episode "Hell's Angel" of the situation comedy Double Rush.

He later joined the cast of the HBO prison drama Oz as Correctional Officer Sean Murphy. However, in between these roles, Clohessy had a supporting role as Thomas Smaraldo on NBC's comedy/drama Tattingers (1988–89) and soon after appeared in a starring role on NBC's short-lived comedy One of the Boys (1989). Clohessy co-starred on the Neal Marlens/Carol Black ABC sitcom Laurie Hill in 1992, playing a stay-at-home freelance writer. In 2008, Clohessy had a regular role in the short-lived Fox show New Amsterdam. He won a Screen Actors Guild Award for Best Ensemble in the HBO series Boardwalk Empire.

In feature films, Clohessy played a supporting role in Across the Universe, playing the part of Jude's long-lost father. He played Jack Parker in The Crimson Mask. His largest big budget film role was opposite Ryan Gosling in The Place Beyond the Pines. Onstage, he played Mike in the Broadway Roundabout Theatre Company revival of Pal Joey, from November, 2008 through February 2009. He played the bartender in 27 Dresses (2008). From 2010 to the present (2021), he has had a supporting role as Sid Gormley, on the police drama Blue Bloods. In January 2012, he played Jack Healy in Season 1/Episode 13 in Unforgettable. In 2012, he portrayed Sergeant Silva in the film The Avengers.

Filmography

Film

Television

References

External links

1957 births
Male actors from New York (state)
American male film actors
American male television actors
American male musical theatre actors
Living people
People from Pearl River, New York
State University of New York at Purchase alumni
20th-century American male actors
21st-century American male actors